Haystack Mountain may refer to:

United States
 Haystack Mountain (Connecticut)
 Haystack Mountain School of Crafts, Deer Isle, Maine, United States
 Haystack Mountain (Maryland)
 Haystack Mountain (Hill County, Montana), a mountain in Hill County, Montana
 Haystack Mountain (Jefferson County, Montana), in the Boulder Mountains
 Haystack Mountain (Lincoln County, Montana), a mountain in Lincoln County, Montana
 Haystack Mountain (Powell County, Montana), a mountain in Powell County, Montana
 Haystack Mountain (Sanders County, Montana), a mountain in Sanders County, Montana
 Haystack Mountain (New Mexico)
 Mount Haystack (New York)
 Haystack Mountain (Pennsylvania)
 Haystack Mountain (Vermont)
 Haystack Mountain Ski Area
 Haystack Mountain (Wyoming)

Elsewhere
 Haystack Mountain (New South Wales), Australia, northwest of the town of Bonalbo

See also
 Little Haystack Mountain (New Hampshire)